Philippe de Lenoncourt (born 1527 in the Coupvray Castle; died on December 13, 1592 in Rome, Papal States) was a French cardinal of the Catholic Church.

Biography 
Philippe de Lenoncourt was elected bishop of Châlons in 1550 as the successor to his uncle Robert de Lenoncourt. He was commendatory abbot of Saint-Martin of Épernay, Rabais and Oigny. In 1560 he was transferred to the diocese of Auxerre. His family was an ally of the Dinteville, of whom two members, namely François de Dinteville (1513–1530) and François de Dinteville II (1530–1554) had preceded Robert de Lenoncourt to the bishopric of Auxerre. On December 31, 1578, he was made a Knight of the Order of the Holy Spirit.

He was created a cardinal by Pope Sixtus V during the November 16, 1586 consistory. He was prefect of the Congregation of the Index in 1588.

Cardinal Lenoncourt took part to the conclaves of 1590 (election of Popes Urban VII and Gregory XIV), 1591 (election of Pope Innocent IV) and 1592 (election of Pope Clement VII).

See also 
 Cardinals created by Sixtus V
 List of the Knights of the Order of the Holy Spirit

References

Bibliography

External links 
 
 

People from Lorraine
Bishops of Châlons-sur-Marne
Bishops of Auxerre
16th-century French cardinals
1527 births
1592 deaths